Block is an unincorporated community in Miami County, Kansas, United States.

History
The community is also known as Block Corners.

References

Further reading

External links
 Miami County maps: Current, Historic, KDOT

Unincorporated communities in Miami County, Kansas
Unincorporated communities in Kansas